Kettmann is a surname. Notable people with the surname include:

 George Kettmann (1898–1970), Dutch National Socialist
 Steve Kettmann, American writer and editor

See also
 Kottmann